The Divine Sinner is a 1928 American silent film directed by Scott Pembroke and starring Vera Reynolds, Nigel De Brulier and Bernard Siegel.

This film is now lost.

Cast
 Vera Reynolds as Lillia Ludwig 
 Nigel De Brulier as Minister of Police 
 Bernard Siegel as Johan Ludwig 
 Ernest Hilliard as Prince Josef Miguel 
 Hans Joby as Luque Bernstorff
 Carole Lombard as Millie Claudert 
 Harry Northrup as Amb. D'Ray 
 James Ford as Heinrich 
 Alphonse Martell as Paul Coudert

References

Bibliography
 Wes D. Gehring. Carole Lombard, the Hoosier Tornado. Indiana Historical Society Press, 2003.

External links
 
 

1928 films
Films directed by Scott Pembroke
American silent feature films
American black-and-white films
Lost American films
Rayart Pictures films
1920s English-language films
1920s American films